James Lowangcha Wanglat is an Indian politician. He has served as Home, Finance and Civil Supplies Minister of State in Government of Arunachal Pradesh.

Early life
Wanglat hails from the royal family known as the lowang's of Namsang-Borduria. He became a student activist in 1969. He took part in the founding of the North East Frontier Agency Students Union in 1970 and the All Arunachal Pradesh Students Union in 1971. He was arrested during protests in 1974 and all charges were dropped by the Arunachal Pradesh (NEFA) Administration. In 1977 he became the founding general secretary of the People's Party of Arunachal. 
 

After serving as an Member of the Legislative Assembly (MLA) in the state of Arunachal Pradesh for 20 years, James L Wanglat has retired from active politics in 2019.

References

Arunachal Pradesh politicians
People's Party of Arunachal politicians
Bharatiya Janata Party politicians from Arunachal Pradesh
Living people
Janata Dal politicians
Indian National Congress politicians from Arunachal Pradesh
Arunachal Congress politicians
Nationalist Congress Party politicians from Arunachal Pradesh
Year of birth missing (living people)
Naga people
Arunachal Pradesh MLAs 1990–1995
Arunachal Pradesh MLAs 1995–1999
Arunachal Pradesh MLAs 1999–2004
Arunachal Pradesh MLAs 1980–1984